Podboršt is a settlement in the Municipality of Ivančna Gorica in central Slovenia. It lies just south of the Slovenian A2 motorway in the historical region of Lower Carniola. The municipality is now included in the Central Slovenia Statistical Region.

References

External links

Podboršt on Geopedia

Populated places in the Municipality of Ivančna Gorica